The Cathexis are a race of sixth-dimensional beings from the DC Universe.

Fictional character biography
Originating from the sixth dimension of reality - as opposed to humanity's existence in the third dimension - the Cathexis are an advanced and powerful race, capable of creating sentient energy beings and wielding remarkable power in their own right. Wishing to expand their power, they created the sentient energy 'Id', an energy field capable of modifying reality based on the wishes of those it made contact with and subsequently modifying the vibrations of subatomic particles to grant wishes, and unleashed it upon Earth.

Upon arriving in this dimension, Id essentially began to act like the malevolent genie, granting any wishes that it sensed to give the wish-maker precisely what was asked for without giving them precisely what they wanted.  As its first wish in this dimension, it latched on to the strongest superhuman mind it could find, Superman, just as he was wishing that those superhumans who had two lives sometimes did not have to cope with such pressures. As a result, he, Batman, the Flash, Green Lantern, Plastic Man and the Martian Manhunter were split into their human and superhuman identities; Wonder Woman and Aquaman alone remained the same because they had no secret identities in the first place.

However, as Wonder Woman and Aquaman swiftly realized, the separation had been far from perfect; without the other identity to balance out their personalities, the heroes began to change in initially subtle but increasingly obvious ways:
 Lacking Clark Kent's influence, Superman grew increasingly alien and aloof from the people he had vowed to protect, changing his costume to a more Kryptonian style of clothing and on one occasion actually partially lobotomizing a new opponent to shut down the part of his brain that allowed him to use his new powers, while Clark Kent, despite enjoying his new freedom not to have to lie about where he was, became increasingly fearful of even simple things like heights, and became increasingly less confident in himself.
 Being normally driven by Bruce Wayne's memory of the deaths of Thomas and Martha Wayne, Batman rapidly lost his spirit and resolve without Wayne's memory to drive him, becoming a faceless individual with no real drives of his own, while Wayne, unable to channel his rage into his Batman identity, became increasingly hostile, violently beating a couple of vandals who attempted to graffiti his car.
 Lacking Wally's human influence, the Flash simply reveled in his speed with no thought for the past - he even changed his costume, despite promising to keep it the way it was to honor the memory of Barry Allen - while Wally, lacking the Flash's haste, became increasingly lethargic, even missing dinner dates with his wife Linda.
 Without the Green Lantern ring to properly express himself creatively, Kyle Rayner began to increasingly descend into madness, obsessively sketching down ideas to try to keep himself under control, while Green Lantern lacked any imagination and simply used his ring as a weapon, to the point where he simply attempted to shoot at a massive flood rather than taking the more responsible solution of erecting a wall to contain it.
 Without Eel O'Brien's darker nature, Plastic Man degenerated from being a man with a sense of humor to being a near-ineffective idiot, making inappropriate jokes in the middle of a crisis, while O'Brien found himself contemplating returning to his criminal ways without Plastic Man's powers and lighter nature to give him a reason to remain a hero.
 As with Superman, Martian Manhunter began to grow aloof from his adopted people and assume a more Martian-like appearance, while John Jones (by contrast to the others) reveled in his new freedom, including his lack of a fear of fire and him no longer being plagued by the long-standing grief from being the last of his race.

While investigating the apparent resurrection of the deceased Metamorpho, the League met the Cathexis for the first time and learned about Id; Metamorpho had been brought back by his son Joey's wish, but Joey had unfortunately wished that his father was back rather than alive, and so Id had translated his wish as such. Using the residual 'Id energies' left from the wish, the Cathexis were able to reverse the wish, and explained the situation to the League. Accompanied by the League, the Cathexis subsequently tracked Id to Los Angeles after it turned the entire city blind following a scarred beauty queen's yell of "Don't look at me!!" while on live television. With Id having been captured by Wonder Woman's lasso and the Flash's vibrations, the Cathexis showed their true colors and turned on the League.

Fortunately, Eel O'Brien - realizing the problems being faced by the divided Leaguers - had managed to gather the League's civilian identities together, the six civilians confronting the Cathexis while Eel attempted to use their equipment to reverse Superman's original wish. On the other hand, so much time had passed that there was not enough energy to fully reverse the wish, and the 'merge' back consisted of a haphazard mess, with both personas struggling for dominance. As the Cathexis divided Aquaman into his fish and human sides, Wonder Woman, taking a last desperate gambit, tricked them into separating her soul of truth from her physical form, her spirit form thus able to reveal the truth to her six split teammates - that they were stronger together than apart. Using Id's power, the Flash divided the Cathexis from two six-dimensional creatures into four three-dimensional ones, the Cathexis subsequently being easily defeated by Batman. With this achieved, the League united around Id, channeling their combined desires into a wish for Id to destroy itself and banish the Cathexis back to their dimension, lacking the knowledge to ever recreate Id again.

References

DC Comics alien species
DC Comics deities
DC Comics extraterrestrial supervillains
DC Comics supervillains